The Aiqqujat Islands are an uninhabited island group in Kivalliq Region, Nunavut, Canada. They are located in Hudson Bay's Wager Bay, and are a part of Ukkusiksalik National Park.

References 

Islands of Hudson Bay
Uninhabited islands of Kivalliq Region